Potassium fumarate is a compound with formula K2C4H2O4. It is the potassium salt of fumaric acid.

It has E number "E366".

References 

Fumarates
Potassium compounds